The Internet real-name system in China is a real-name system in which Internet service providers and Internet content providers (especially user-generated content sites) in the People's Republic of China are required to collect users' real names, ID numbers, and other information when providing services. Since the implementation of the real-name system on the Internet may lead to the infringement and narrowing of the constitutionally protected speech space of Internet users, it has attracted concerns from all sides and generated much controversy in Chinese society. Only a few countries in the world, such as South Korea, have implemented a real-name system on the Internet.

History

Proposal to ban anonymity in civil society
The origin of the proposed ban on anonymity in mainland China is generally believed to be the proposal made by Li Xiguang, a journalism professor at Tsinghua University, in 2002, when he talked about journalism reform in the South, that "the Chinese National People's Congress should ban anyone from being anonymous online". He argued that the Internet should be strictly protected by copyright and intellectual property rights, and that "at the same time, online writing should be legally responsible," and that "including traditional media, we should promote the use of real names, not pseudonyms... publishing under pseudonyms is irresponsible to the public. ".

His remarks caused an uproar on the Internet and became known as the "Li Xiguang incident". Although there was a period of heated debate, no corresponding measures were subsequently introduced and the matter was left unresolved. Afterwards, Li Xiguang himself said that he had lost interest in the topic of real names on the Internet, and that "banning online anonymity is very unrealistic and not legally or technically feasible."

The Chinese government's implementation of an online real-name system
In 2012, the Standing Committee of the National People's Congress (NPC) of China adopted the Decision of the NPC Standing Committee on Strengthening the Protection of Internet Information. The decision requires limited online real names, i.e., service providers require users to provide identity information when they "provide website access services, go through network entry procedures for fixed-line and cell phones, or provide information distribution services for users. On March 16, 2012, Sina, Sohu, NetEase and Tencent officially implemented the real name system for microblogs.

Article 24 of the Cybersecurity Law of the People's Republic of China, adopted on November 7, 2016, provides that "network operators shall require users to provide real identity information when signing agreements with users or confirming the provision of services for network access, domain name registration services, and network entry procedures for fixed and mobile telephones, or providing information dissemination and instant messaging services for users. Users do not provide real identity information, the network operator shall not provide relevant services for them." This is the first time in mainland China to clarify the real-name network system in the form of a law.

On August 25, 2017, the Cyberspace Administration of China announced the Regulations on the Administration of Internet Follow-Up Commenting Services, which came into effect on October 1, 2017. The regulations include that websites shall not provide follow-up commenting services to users without real-name authentication, and user comments on news information shall be reviewed before publication.

On September 7, 2017, the Cyberspace Administration of China issued the Regulations on the Administration of Internet Group Information Services, which came into effect on October 8, 2017.

Status

Internet cafe
Beginning in 2003, Internet cafe management authorities across China began requiring all customers accessing the Internet at Internet cafes to present their ID cards to the cafes, register in their real names, and apply for one-card and IC cards, on the grounds of preventing minors from entering the cafes.

Email
On May 13, 2004, the Internet Society of China issued the Internet E-mail Service Standard (Draft for Public Comments), which proposed the real-name system for the first time and emphasized that e-mail service providers should require customers to submit real customer information, which would be the standard for judging the attribution of mailbox services. However, the Internet E-mail Service Standard, which came into effect on March 20, 2006, only adopted a registration system for e-mail server IP addresses. In addition, on September 26, 2004, the China Youth Network Association, which is supervised by the Communist Youth League of China, established a professional committee for games and decided to establish a national gamers' club for Chinese youth in the coming year to lay the foundation for implementing a real-name system in online games.

Website
On May 18, 2004, websites implementing the site-wide real-name system appeared.

In 2005, the Ministry of Information Industry (MIIT), in conjunction with relevant departments, required all website organizers in the territory to register for the record through IDCs and ISPs that provide access, hosting, and content services for websites, or log on to the MIIT record website to file themselves. Whether it is a corporate or institutional website, or a personal website, all must provide a valid document number at the time of filing. The Communications Regulatory Authority will temporarily shut down websites that have not reported relevant information to the record management system by midnight on June 30, and notify the relevant access service providers to temporarily stop their access services. The person in charge of the Telecommunications Administration of the Ministry of Information Industry urged the temporarily closed websites to make up for the filing procedures before midnight on July 10, otherwise they will be closed.

In 2004, the Opinions on Further Strengthening Campus Network Management of Higher Education Institutions issued by the Chinese Ministry of Education (MOE) explicitly proposed to implement the real-name system in college education networks, and became an important basis for the MOE to conduct audits on Chinese colleges and universities. By March 2005, a number of major universities' BBS, led by Shuimu Qinghua BBS of Tsinghua University, changed to the real-name only intra-campus communication platform.

In October 2006, the Ministry of Information Industry of the People's Republic of China proposed to implement a real-name system for blogs, which aroused great opposition online. in March 2007, the Internet Society of China issued a message that the Internet Society of China was promoting a real-name system for blogs, which was considered by the media to be a foregone conclusion. Previously, there were already blog service providers in China that launched blog sites with real-name registration system for the whole site.

On May 28, 2007, a few websites had implemented the third anniversary of the real-name system.

In January 2008, the legislative process of the real-name Internet system was launched.

In August 2008, the Ministry of Industry and Information Technology (MIIT) formally responded to the proposed legislation on the real-name system, which was not passed, but stated that "realizing the management of limited real-name network" would be the direction of the future healthy development of the Internet.

On April 13, 2010, the People's Daily published an op-ed: Lin Yongqing: The Argument of the Pros and Cons of the Real-Name System.

On March 16, 2012, Sina, Sohu, Netease, and Tencent Weibo officially implemented the real-name system for microblogs.

On December 28, 2012, the 30th meeting of the Standing Committee of the 11th National People's Congress considered and adopted the draft decision on strengthening the protection of network information, which provides that "network service providers for users to access websites, fixed-line phones, cell phones and other procedures to the Internet, or to provide users with information dissemination services, should be in the user When signing an agreement, the user shall be required to provide true identity information".

On March 29, 2013, the General Office of the State Council of the People's Republic of China "Notice on the Implementation of the State Council Institutional Reform and Functional Transformation Program", in which "tasks to be completed in 2014", Article 13 reads "the introduction and implementation of information network real name registration system. (Ministry of Industry and Information Technology, the State Internet Information Office in conjunction with the Ministry of Public Security is responsible for. completed by the end of June 2014)".

On November 6, 2014, the State Internet Information Office held a special meeting on the management of follow-up comments and required 29 websites to sign the "Commitment to Self-Discipline Management of Follow-up Comments. The third article of the "Commitment", "insisting that users register their accounts with real identity information", is considered to require the mandatory use of real-name accounts to post comments.

In May 2016, Alipay implemented a real-name system in response to strict regulation by relevant authorities, but it was subsequently pushed back to July 1. According to the Measures for the Administration of Network Payment Business of Non-Bank Payment Institutions, network payment business operated by non-bank payment institutions is governed by a real-name system, and all users need to register with their real names in order to use the network payment business.

In May 2017, Baidu began prompting users when logging in, "In response to national legal requirements, a real name accoung is required to use Internet services from 6. 1, to ensure the normal use of Baidu account, please complete cell phone number verification as soon as possible.", and accounts can no longer be registered with an email address, and you must you a Chinese cell phone number. to complete registration.

On May 22, 2017, following Baidu's announcement to implement a real-name system, Zhihu announced that it would gradually implement account real-name authentication.

On July 5, 2017, Bilibili announced that real-name authentication was required for submissions, and domestic users were required to bind their cell phone numbers, while overseas users were required to upload proof of identity in addition to their cell phone numbers. On September 22, 2017, Bilibili announced that it would strengthen its real-name authentication mechanism: from September 29, 2017, accounts that had not completed binding their cell phone numbers could not perform operations such as submitting articles, posting pop-ups, sending private messages and comments.

Online gaming
On July 20, 2005, Tencent, the largest instant messaging company in China, issued an announcement that it would cooperate with the Chinese authorities to organize the online public information services carried out by Tencent and register the creators and administrators of QQ groups under their real names in accordance with the Notice of the Shenzhen Public Security Bureau on Cleaning and Rectifying Online Public Information Service Sites. This coincided with media coverage of the real-name system in South Korea, and Tencent's initiative was widely seen as "a prelude to the full implementation of the real-name system in China."

On July 22, 2005, Xinhua said that from July 22 to the end of September, the police in Shenzhen, China, will carry out a three-month cleanup and improvement of online public information service sites. Among other things, the police will register BBS and BBS moderators with real names and verify ID numbers. on August 5 China's Ministry of Culture and Ministry of Information Industry jointly issued Several Opinions on the Development and Management of Online Games. The draft of the opinion says to prevent minors from indulging in online games to kill monsters and practice leveling, and requires that "PK-type leveling games (relying on PK to increase level) should be logged in through ID cards, implement a real-name game system, and disallow minors from logging in". According to the Regulations on the Protection of Minors' Network (draft for review), "network information service providers providing online game services shall require online game users to provide real identity information for registration and effectively identify minor users. It also stipulates that network information service providers shall, in accordance with relevant national regulations and standards, take technical measures to not expose minors to games or game functions that are inappropriate for them to access, limit the time minors can use games continuously and the cumulative time they can use games in a single day, and prohibit minors from using online game services between midnight and 8:00 AM every day.".

On August 30, 2021, the State Press and Publication Administration issued the Notice of the State Press and Publication Administration on Further Strict Management to Effectively Prevent Minors from Being Addicted to Online Games, which stipulates that all online game enterprises may only provide online game services to minors for one hour from 20:00 to 21:00 daily on Fridays, Saturdays, Sundays and legal holidays, and may not provide online game services to minors in any form at other times.

SIM card
Starting in 2016, the use of cell phone numbers in mainland China must be registered with real name.

Evaluation
Supporters believe that "the most attractive part of the Internet is not 'anonymity', but that it is easier and faster to communicate." Others believe that real names help to remove all kinds of spam, Internet fraud and rumors, and increase the credibility of information and trust among Internet users. Others believe that real names are good for removing all kinds of spam, online fraud and rumors from the Internet, increasing the credibility of information and trust among Internet users, and "creating a more harmonious and nutritious Internet culture".

On the other hand, opponents believe that "the charm of the Internet lies in anonymity", and that if websites do not adopt good confidentiality measures, the real-name system is likely to lead to the leakage of a large amount of users' personal privacy, with serious consequences. Even if the site has taken good enough confidentiality measures, many Internet users are inclined to set the password of their important personal accounts very simple, so that it is easy to crack, so that the same may cause very serious consequences. Then again, the local government can use certain methods to get the user's personal information, and the real-name system makes it easier to retaliate and other acts, so there needs to be a complementary and complete reporting system and protection of freedom of expression of true information, to protect the truth-teller from retaliation of the legal and administrative system is the most critical. Let's step back for a moment, even if you really have a good real-name system, and can completely avoid and/or solve all the above problems, when cybercrime is actually committed, if the public security officials do not try to solve, give no interest, accept bribes, etc., it does not make much sense. Moreover, on the Internet, everyone can speak freely. As for the slander or illegal speech, that can be solved by technical means."

On the other hand, there are also people who believe that the "dual method" should be used, "You can require real names in some large, formal websites to increase the credibility of the information; some small forums are not required, leaving everyone free to "flood" space."

Related Laws 
 Decision of the Standing Committee of the National People's Congress on Strengthening the Protection of Internet Information
 Measures for the Administration of Internet Information Services (Order of the State Council No. 292)
 "Non-operating Internet Information Services Record Management Measures" (Ministry of Information Industry Decree No. 33)
 Anti-Terrorism Law of the People's Republic of China
 Cybersecurity Law of the People's Republic of China

See also
 Internet censorship in China
 Real-name system
 Human flesh search engine
 Doxxing
 Human rights in China

References

 
Human rights abuses in China
Internet in China
China
China
Articles containing video clips
Internet privacy
Human names